Svilen Shterev (born 14 December 1992) is a Bulgarian professional footballer who plays as a midfielder for Bulgarian Third League club Sayana Haskovo.

Career
Shterev played for Oborishte Panagyurishte. On 24 June 2017, he signed a 2-year contract with Montana. On 6 September 2017, following the appointment of new manager Ferario Spasov, his contract was terminated by mutual consent.

On 8 September 2017, Shterev signed with Maritsa Plovdiv. He left the club at the end of the 2017–18 season following the relegation to Third League.  On 2 July 2018, Shterev joined Botev Galabovo. 
In August 2021, Shterev signed with Sayana Haskovo.

References

External links

1992 births
Living people
Bulgarian footballers
First Professional Football League (Bulgaria) players
Second Professional Football League (Bulgaria) players
PFC Pirin Gotse Delchev players
FC Oborishte players
FC Montana players
FC Maritsa Plovdiv players
FC Botev Galabovo players
FC Dunav Ruse players
SFC Etar Veliko Tarnovo players
Association football midfielders